Joachim Schür (born 13 October 1957) is a German boxer. He competed in the men's flyweight event at the 1976 Summer Olympics.

References

External links
 

1957 births
Living people
German male boxers
Olympic boxers of West Germany
Boxers at the 1976 Summer Olympics
People from Herne, North Rhine-Westphalia
Sportspeople from Arnsberg (region)
Flyweight boxers